Giulio Masi (1570–1636) was a Catholic prelate who served as Bishop of Monopoli (1627–1636) and Bishop of Giovinazzo (1611–1627).

Biography
Giulio Masi was born in Arezzo, Italy in 1570. On 18 May 1611, he was appointed during the papacy of Pope Paul V as Bishop of Giovinazzo. On 23 May 1611, he was consecrated bishop by Roberto Francesco Romolo Bellarmino, Cardinal-Priest of San Matteo in Merulana, with Attilio Amalteo, Titular Archbishop of Athenae, and Antonio d'Aquino, Bishop of Sarno, serving as co-consecrators. On 18 July 1627, he was appointed during the papacy of Pope Urban VIII as Bishop of Monopoli. He served as Bishop of Monopoli until his death in 1636.

References

External links and additional sources
 (for Chronology of Bishops) 
 (for Chronology of Bishops) 
 (for Chronology of Bishops) 
 (for Chronology of Bishops) 

17th-century Italian Roman Catholic bishops
Bishops appointed by Pope Paul V
Bishops appointed by Pope Urban VIII
Bishops of Monopoli
1570 births
1636 deaths